Proscillaridin is a cardiac glycoside, a kind of drug that can be used in the treatment of congestive heart failure and cardiac arrhythmia (irregular heartbeat). It is of the bufanolide type and can be obtained from plants of the genus Scilla and in Drimia maritima (Scilla maritima).

The aglycone of proscillaridin is scillarenin.

References 

Rhamnosides
Bufanolides